The Great Warrior of Montauban is a bronze sculpture by Antoine Bourdelle.

It was commissioned in 1897, by the village of Montauban to commemorate the Franco-Prussian War.
It was modeled in 1898 to 1900, and cast in 1956.

It is an edition of ten; number three is at the Hirshhorn Museum and Sculpture Garden.
It appeared in LIFE magazine.

See also
 List of public art in Washington, D.C., Ward 2

References

External links
waymarking
Bluffton

Sculptures of the Smithsonian Institution
1900 sculptures
Hirshhorn Museum and Sculpture Garden
Bronze sculptures in Washington, D.C.
Nude sculptures in the United States
Outdoor sculptures in Washington, D.C.
Sculptures of men in Washington, D.C.